Pink Season: The Prophecy is an extended play by YouTube personality George "Joji" Miller, under the alias Pink Guy. It was released on 24 May 2017 under the 88rising label and features remixes of songs from the album Pink Season. This would be the final release done by George Miller under the Pink Guy alias.

Track listing

Charts

References 

2017 EPs
Joji (musician) albums
Remix EPs
2017 remix albums
88rising EPs
Electronic dance music EPs